Ruzhin Kerimov (also known as Ruzhdi Kerimov ; born 15 July 1956) is a retired Bulgarian footballer who played as a midfielder.

Football career
Born in Plovdiv, Kerimov started playing football for hometown club Lokomotiv Plovdiv. In 1980, he joined CSKA Sofia, where he would enjoy his greatest successes, winning three consecutive national championships and adding two Bulgarian Cups; in the first round of the 1980–81 European Cup, he scored against Nottingham Forest in a 1–0 away win (2–0 on aggregate), as the capital club eventually reached the quarterfinals.

In 1986, aged 30, Kerimov moved abroad, playing for Altay S.K. in Turkey (helping to the eighth position in the Süper Lig). He made six appearances for the Bulgarian national team, his debut arriving in 1978.

Honours
CSKA Sofia
 Bulgarian A Group (3): 1980–81, 1981–82, 1982–83
 Bulgarian Cup (2): 1983, 1985

References

External links
 
 
 
 

1956 births
Living people
Bulgarian footballers
Bulgaria international footballers
Association football midfielders
First Professional Football League (Bulgaria) players
Süper Lig players
PFC Lokomotiv Plovdiv players
PFC CSKA Sofia players
Altay S.K. footballers
Varzim S.C. players
S.C. Covilhã players
Bulgarian expatriate footballers
Expatriate footballers in Turkey
Expatriate footballers in Portugal
Bulgarian people of Romani descent
Footballers from Plovdiv